Club Unión Collado Villalba is a Spanish football club based in Collado Villalba, in the autonomous community of Madrid. Founded in 1972, it plays in Tercera División – Group 7, holding home games at Ciudad Deportiva de Collado Villalba, which has a capacity of 1,000 spectators.

History

Club Deportivo Villalba was founded in 1972, in 1975 merges with another club of the city to form the Unión Deportiva Collado Villalba, renamed in 1992 as Club Unión Collado Villalba.

Season to season

C.D. Villalba

C.D.C. Villalba

U.D.C. Villalba / C.U.C. Villalba

7 seasons in Tercera División

Uniforms
First kit: Yellow shirt, shorts and socks.
Alternative kit: Blue shirt, shorts and socks.

Former players
 Martín Prest
 Eloy
 Dani Hernández

References

External links
Official website 

Football clubs in the Community of Madrid
Association football clubs established in 1972
1972 establishments in Spain